GOES-G was a weather satellite to be operated by the National Oceanic and Atmospheric Administration. The satellite was designed to sense and monitor meteorological conditions from a geostationary orbit, intended to replace GOES-5 and provide continuous vertical profiles of atmospheric temperature and moisture. It was lost due to the launch failure of a Delta 3914 rocket on 3 May 1986.

Launch 

Launch occurred on May 3, 1986 at 22:18 GMT, aboard Delta 178, the first NASA launch following the Challenger disaster. Seventy-one seconds into the flight, the first stage RS-27 engine shut down prematurely due to an electrical fault, and the rocket was destroyed by range safety.

References

External links 

NSSDC Entry

Geostationary Operational Environmental Satellites
Satellite launch failures
Spacecraft launched in 1986